The 1996–97 Oklahoma Sooners men's basketball team represented the University of Oklahoma in competitive college basketball during the 1996–97 NCAA Division I men's basketball season. The Oklahoma Sooners men's basketball team played its home games in the Lloyd Noble Center and was a member of the National Collegiate Athletic Association's Big 12 Conference.

The team posted a 19–11 overall record (9–7 Big 12). The Sooners received a bid to the 1997 NCAA tournament as No. 11 seed in the West region. The Sooners lost to No. 6 seed Stanford, 80–67, in the opening round.

Roster

Schedule and results

|-
!colspan=9 style=| Non-conference regular season

|-
!colspan=9 style=| Big 12 Regular Season

|-
!colspan=9 style=| Big 12 Tournament

|-
!colspan=9 style=| NCAA Tournament

Rankings

References

Oklahoma Sooners men's basketball seasons
Oklahoma
Oklahoma